Samantha Besson, born on March 30, 1973 in Beirut, is a law professor specialized in Public International Law and European Law. She holds the chair "The International Law of Institutions" at the Collège de France (Paris) and is a part-time professor at the University of Fribourg (Switzerland).

Life

Originally from the Vaud canton in Switzerland, she studied at the universities of Fribourg (Bachelor and Master's degree in 1996 and doctorate in 1999), Oxford (Magister Juris in 1998) and Bern (habilitation in Legal Theory and in Swiss, Comparative, European and International Constitutional Law in 2004). She then taught at Oxford University (2001-2003) and the University of Geneva (2001-2005), before becoming a professor at the University of Fribourg (since 2004). She has also been a Visiting Professor at the Universities of Zurich (2007-2010), Duke (2009), Lausanne (2010), Lisbon (2010-2019), Harvard (2014) and Pennsylvania (2019). From 2011 to 2012, she was a Research Fellow at the Wissenschaftskolleg zu Berlin. Furthermore, she has taught in various capacities at The Hague Academy of International Law (2009-2013; 2013; 2020). She was a member of the Scientific Council of the Nantes Institute for Advanced Study Foundation up until 2021, and is currently a member of the Board of the Swiss Academy of Human and Social Sciences, and was the very first delegate for Human Rights at the Swiss Academies of Sciences. She is also the co-chair of the ILA Study Group on the International Law of Regional Institutions, and an associate member of the Institute of International Law since 2021.

In 2019, she was elected at the Collège de France (only woman out of twelve nominations) as holder of the Chair "Droit international des institutions" (The International Law of Institutions). Her inaugural lecture took place on 3 December 2020, and was titled "Reconstruire l'ordre institutionnel international" (Reconstructing the International Institutional Order).

Samantha Besson's research interests lie at the intersection of general International Law and legal philosophy, and in particular: international and European human rights law; international and European law on sources and responsibility; comparative domestic, regional and European Union external relations law; international and European citizenship law and democratic theory.

In 2021, she was named Chevalière de l'Ordre national de la Légion d'honneur.

Selected works 

A full bibliography is regularly updates on the Collège de France website, and a certain number of articles are accessible online. 

Samantha Besson (2021). Reconstruire l'ordre institutionnel international: Leçons inaugurales du Collège de France (in français). Paris: Collège de France/Fayard. . 

 English version: Samantha Besson (2021). Reconstructing the International Institutional Order: Inaugural Lectures of the Collège de France. OpenEdition Books/Collège de France. 
 German version: Samantha Besson (2022). Zum Wiederaufbau der internationalen Institutionenordnung. Translation by O. Ammann and D. Wohlwend. Beiträge zum Völkerrecht. Basel: Helbing Lichtenhahn & Baden-Baden: Nomos. 

Samantha Besson (2020). La due diligence en droit international (in français). Leiden: Brill Nijhoff. p. 432. .

 Samantha Besson, Samuel Jubé (2020). Concerter les civilisations - Mélanges en l'honneur d'Alain Supiot (in français). Paris: Seuil. p. 496. .

 Samantha Besson, Andreas R. Ziegler (2020). Traités internationaux (et droit des relations extérieures de la Suisse) (in français). Berne: Stämpfli. p. 1808. .

 Samantha Besson (2019). Droit international public (in français). Berne: Stämpfli. p. 827. . 

 Samantha Besson (2019). Droit constitutionnel européen: Précis de droit et résumés de jurisprudence (in français). Berne: Stämpfli. p. 520. .

 Samantha Besson, Jean D'Aspremont (2018). The Oxford Handbook of the Sources of International Law (in anglais). Oxford: Oxford University Press. p. 1232. .

 Samantha Besson (2017). International Responsibility. Essays in Law, History and Philosophy (in anglais). Zürich: Schulthess. p. 258. .

 Samantha Besson, Andreas R. Ziegler (2014). Egalité et non-discrimination en droit international et européen (in Multilingue). Zürich: Schulthess. p. 238. .

 Samantha Besson, Eva Maria Belser (2014). La Convention européenne des droits de l'homme et les cantons / Die Europäische Menschenrechtskonvention und die Kantone (in allemand). Zürich: Schulthess. p. 348. .CS1 

 Samantha Besson, Stephan Breitenmoser, Marco Sassoli, Andreas R. Ziegler (2013). Völkerrecht - Droit international public. Aide-mémoire (in allemand). Zürich: Dike. p. 436. .

 Samantha Besson, Andreas R. Ziegler (2013). Le juge en droit européen et international / The Judge in European and International Law (in français). Zürich: Schulthess. p. 343. .

 Samantha Besson, Nicola Levrat (2012). (Dés)ordres juridiques européens /European Legal (Dis)orderes (in français). Zürich: Schulthess. p. 290. .

 Samantha Besson (2011). La Cour européenne des droits de l'homme après le Protocole 14 / The European Court of Human Rights after Protocol 14 (in français). Zürich: Schulthess. p. 248. .

 Samantha Besson, John Tasioulas (2010). The Philosophy of International Law (in anglais). Oxford: Oxford University Press. p. 626. .

 Samantha Besson, Jose Luis Marti (2009). Legal Republicanism: National and International Perspectives (in anglais). Oxford: Oxford University Press. .

 Samantha Besson, Jose Luis Marti (2006). Deliberative Democracy and its Discontents (in anglais). Routledge. p. 296. .

 Samantha Besson (2005). The Morality of Conflict: Reasonable Disagreement and the Law (in anglais). Oxford: Hart Publishing. p. 624. .

 Samantha Besson (1999). L'égalité horizontale: l'égalité de traitement entre particuliers. Des fondements théoriques en droit privé suisse (in français). Fribourg: Editions Universitaires de Fribourg. p. 526. .

References 

Academic staff of the University of Fribourg

Year of birth missing (living people)
Living people
Members of the Institut de Droit International
Academic staff of the Collège de France
International law scholars